Campbellsville University (CU) is a private Christian university in Campbellsville, Kentucky. It was founded as Russell Creek Academy and enrolls more than 12,000 students. The university offers associate, bachelor's, and master's degrees.

In 2014, the university trustees ended its covenant agreement with the Kentucky Baptist Convention (Southern Baptist Convention), but vowed to uphold the ideals.

History

Campbellsville University traces its origins to the founding in 1906 of Russell Creek Academy by the Russell Creek Baptist Association. The academy gradually became a junior college in 1924, later developed its offerings and a four-year curriculum, becoming accredited as a college in 1959. With an expansion of graduate programs, in 1996 the college gained university status.

The president of the university is Michael V. Carter, Ph.D. The immediate past president is Kenneth W. Winters (born 1934). He is a Republican state senator from District 1 based in Murray in southwestern Kentucky.

Forest Shely, a physician in Campbellsville and a 1943 graduate of the former Campbellsville Junior College, served as a trustee of the university for 56 years, from 1954 until his death in 2010.

In 2014, it announced her intention to end her affiliation with the Kentucky Baptist Convention (Southern Baptist Convention), due to its decision to want to elect trustees independently. In 2015, it entered into a mission partnership with the American Baptist Churches USA.

In February 2017, the CU field house was damaged in a fire. The university will raze the old structure and rebuild on the same spot. The new structure was expected to be available in time for the new football season in mid-August.

Academics

School of Music

The Gosser Fine Arts Center is home to Campbellsville University's School of Music. Housed in this complex are classrooms, practice rooms, faculty studios, offices, a computer lab, a piano lab, an instrumental rehearsal hall, a choral rehearsal hall, and the Gheens Recital Hall.

The Music Library is on the mezzanine level of the Montgomery Library. This collection contains performance videos, CDs, AV listening/viewing stations, musical scores, music reference books, and music periodicals. There is a conducting room in the basement level for music students to videotape practice and conducting assignments.

School of Art
Next to the Gosser Fine Arts Center is the university's School of Art. Like Gosser, the School of Art main building also has classrooms, and is to have a computer lab for students who want to learn about art. The School also has a Gallery building and the Tessener complex (which has a printing press room and a classroom), that were once houses.

School of Education
When Campbellsville College gained university status in 1996, the re-organized governance included one college of Arts and Sciences and five schools, including The School of Education, which oversees the preparation of teachers. In the fall of 1996, the School of Education moved its offices into Carter Hall and in 2006 into the new School of Education building. The preparation of teachers has expanded to offering graduate education and online education in a wide variety of certifications and advanced roles. The university offers programs in Louisville, Somerset, Harrodsburg and Elizabethtown in addition to the main campus. The School of Education has been accredited by the National Council for the Accreditation of Teacher Education (NCATE) and the Kentucky Education Professional Standards Board (EPSB) in 2007 and 2012 and by the Council of Accreditation of Educator Preparation (CAEP) and EPSB  in 2019.

Campuses and centers

The  campus is situated in the center of Kentucky, about a half mile from downtown Campbellsville, population 9,000. It is a  educational and research woodland that is being developed by the Division of Natural Science as a regional center for environmental education and research.

Harrodsburg campus
Campbellsville University Harrodsburg is developing into a full second campus, not simply a satellite. It has dorms and sports teams.

Residence halls

Nearly half of the students enrolled at CU live on campus.

 The Residence Village (women)
 The Residence Village (men)
 Broadway
 North Hall
 South Hall East
 South Hall West
 Stapp Hall
 Campbellsville University Apartments

Distance learning
Campbellsville University offers online-degree opportunities. Online programs include four associate degree programs: Associate of Science in Business Administration, Associate of Science in Christian Studies, Associate of Science in Criminal Justice, and Associate of Science in General Studies.

Graduate programs include master's and Rank I programs in education and special education, and master's programs in theology, business administration, counselling, organizational leadership, and social work. Campbellsville University offers an RN to BSN that is designed for nurses looking for a Bachelor of Science in Nursing degree completion program. The accelerated degree programs are Web-based and allow versatile learning.

Athletics

Campbellsville Tigers
The athletic teams of the Campbellsville main campus are called the Tigers. Their official colors are maroon and gray. The university is a member of the National Association of Intercollegiate Athletics (NAIA), primarily competing in the Mid-South Conference (MSC) since the 1995–96 academic year. They are also a member of the National Christian College Athletic Association (NCCAA), primarily competing as an independent in the Mid-East Region of the Division I level. The Tigers previously competed in the Kentucky Intercollegiate Athletic Conference (KIAC; now currently known as the River States Conference (RSC) since the 2016–17 school year) from 1964–65 to 1994–95.

Campbellsville competes in 30 intercollegiate varsity sports: Men's sports include baseball, basketball, bowling, cross country, football, golf, soccer, swimming, tennis, track & field, volleyball and wrestling; while women's sports include basketball, bowling, cross country, dance, flag football, golf, soccer, softball, swimming, tennis, track & field, volleyball and wrestling; and co-ed sports include archery, bass fishing, kayak bass fishing, cheerleading and eSports.

Football
The original football program was discontinued in 1937 during the Great Depression. The college revived the sport in 1987.

The school's football team plays at Finley Stadium.

Wrestling
Several CU teams have received national recognition. Zack Flake, a sophomore from West Chester, Ohio, won Campbellsville's first individual national wrestling championship with his title in the 141-pound weight class in wrestling at the NAIA Wrestling National Championships in 2007.

Men's basketball
The men's basketball team has had three consecutive berths in the NAIA National Basketball tournament, reaching the National Semi-Final in 2008.

Women's basketball
The women's basketball team made their record setting 29th appearance in the NAIA National Basketball Tournament in 2018/19,after completing a sweep of the conference regular season title (undefeated), and winning the conference tournament. The Lady Tigers are coached by former Lady Tiger player and 300+ career coaching wins Ginger High Colvin.

Volleyball
In 2005, volleyball player Amy Eckenfels was recognized as the NAIA National Libero of the Year. In 2006, she set the all-time national record for career digs with 3,569. The volleyball program advanced to its first-ever NAIA National Volleyball tournament in 2007 by defeating rival Georgetown College in the finals of the Region XI qualifying tournament. Lady Tiger Volleyball advanced to the 2008 NCCAA Final Four but lost to Dallas Baptist to conclude the season with a record of 35–11. CU returned to the NCCAA Volleyball Tournament in 2009, sweeping through the field to win the school's first team national championship in Kissimmee, Florida.

Tennis
In addition, the Men's Tennis Team has won 3 NCCAA National Championships in 2012, 2015, and 2018

Harrodsburg Pioneers
The athletic teams of the Harrodsburg campus are called the Pioneers. Their official colors are maroon and gray. The university is a member of the United States Collegiate Athletic Association (USCAA), primarily competing as an Independent since the 2018–19 academic year. They are also a member of the National Christian College Athletic Association (NCCAA), primarily competing as an independent in the Mid-East Region of the Division II level.

Campbellsville–Harrodsburg competes in nine intercollegiate varsity sports: Men's sports include basketball and soccer; while women's sports include basketball and soccer; and co-ed sports include bowling, cheerleading, cross country, eSports and golf.

Men's basketball
The Pioneers men's basketball team won the 2022 NCCAA Division II National Championship by defeating Crown College.

Notable alumni
Sandra Blanton, Democratic member of the Indiana House of Representatives
Nancy Cox, television personality in Lexington, Kentucky
Phil Cunningham, Troy University head basketball coach
E. Bruce Heilman, chancellor of the University of Richmond
Vernie McGaha, Republican member of the Kentucky Senate
Dallas Robinson, the state of Kentucky's sole Army Veteran and Olympian from the 2014 Olympics; Sochi Russia. Hall of fame athlete and coach.
Rick Stansbury, basketball coach
Simon Van Booy, author
Randy Wayne, actor
Wallace Wilkinson, former Governor of Kentucky
Max Wise (born 1975), former FBI agent serving as a member of the Kentucky Senate

References

External links

 
 Campbellsville Tigers athletics website
 Campbellsville–Harrodsburg Pioneers athletics website

 
Private universities and colleges in Kentucky
Educational institutions established in 1906
Buildings and structures in Taylor County, Kentucky
Universities and colleges accredited by the Southern Association of Colleges and Schools
Education in Taylor County, Kentucky
1906 establishments in Kentucky
Council for Christian Colleges and Universities
Campbellsville, Kentucky